Alderman James T. Thompson,  (1849–1921)  was the Mayor of Birkenhead, England  1899.

During his time in office, he earned many presentation pieces, several of which were sold at Bonhams, at Chester, on 4 September 2012.

References

External links 
 Portrait painting of Thompson

Mayors of places in Merseyside
People from Birkenhead
1849 births
1921 deaths
Missing middle or first names
Date of birth missing